A 2-1 road (2-minus-1 road) is a type of road with extra wide shoulders, and a smaller single two-way lane in the middle for vehicles. The shoulders are to be used by pedestrians and cyclists, and if necessary by meeting vehicles. The purpose of the road is to give more space to pedestrians and cyclists and thereby avoid constructing new dedicated pedestrian and bicycle paths, especially in areas where new constructions are to be avoided or not possible.

The road-type is popular in Denmark where a third of all municipalities have at least one stretch of this type of road. Together with other traffic calming measures these roads have lowered traffic accidents with about 25%. Sweden started building this type of road in 2006 and is there called "bymiljöväg", or in English "village environment road", as it often goes through and between different dispersed settlements. There the roads have been met by critique from both residents and the police as they believe it will lead to more accidents. Drivers' behavior have also been criticized.

See also 

 2+1 road
 Road diet
 Reversible lane

References 

Roads in Denmark
Roads in Sweden